Posen is a surname. Notable people with the surname include:

Al Posen, American cartoonist
 Adam Posen (born 1966), American economist
Ariel Posen, Canadian musician 
 Barry Posen (born 1952), professor of political science at MIT
 Louis Posen (born 1971), American music producer
Mika Posen, Canadian violinist and music instructor 
 Shelley Posen (active since 1970s), Canadian folklorist and folk musician 
 Stephen Posen (born 1939), American painter, recipient of a Guggenheim Fellowship in 1986
 Zac Posen (born 1980), American fashion designer

See also
 Posener
 Posner